Bulgaria–Syria relations are foreign relations between Bulgaria and Syria. Both countries established diplomatic relations on August 24, 1954. Since May 1955, Bulgaria has embassy in Damascus and an honorary consulate in Aleppo. Syria has an embassy in Sofia.

Both countries are full members of the Union for the Mediterranean.

Bulgaria has been a regular participant in the annual Damascus International Fair and has returned to participating in 2017 after the fair was held again after a 5-year hiatus and in 2018.

See also
Foreign relations of Bulgaria
Foreign relations of Syria

External links
 Bulgarian embassy in Damascus
 Syrian embassy in Sofia

References

 
Syria
Bilateral relations of Syria